Margay is a kart chassis manufacturer that designs and builds sprint and endurance karts in St. Louis, Missouri, USA.

Margay has been around karting almost since karting began.  The company started out in 1964 making gearboxes for karts then tried building chassis.  It proved to be an instant success.  Margay has built more than 20,000 chassis and has won more races in the World Karting Association (WKA) than any other manufacturer.  Current Margay team drivers who have enjoyed success including WKA triple crowns, manufacturer cups, and championships include Corey Reeves, Eric Morrow, and Caleb Loniewski.  Margay is also a large distributor of Bridgestone tires.

External links
 Margay Official website

Kart manufacturers
Car manufacturers of the United States
Manufacturing companies based in St. Louis